The term “π-shaped skills” also known as pi-shaped skills is a metaphor used to describe employee competencies, where the vertical bars of the “π” reflect the breadth of deep expertise in two disciplines and the horizontal bar represents expertise in other disciplines (a proclivity for collaboration across disciplines), technically, a combination of soft skills and two or more hard skills 
π-shaped professionals are generalists (i.e., characterized as having sufficient skills, expertise, and communication abilities across various disciplines) on one side, and are considered specialists at two or more disciplines on the other side 

Employees with π-shaped skills are those that can utilize both the ‘left brain’ and ‘right brain’ simultaneously. 

Essentially, individuals who are considered left-brained tend to have a cognitive style that emphasizes a methodical and logical approach, whereas those who are considered right-brained tend to have a cognitive style that emphasizes a creative and intuitive approach

Although π-shaped skilled professionals can focus on one or both skill sets, being conversant with other domains offers opportunity for innovative exploration and exploitation, and the ability to occupy various roles within a team or working on projects.

References